Tau Persei (τ Per), also known as 18 Persei, is a binary star in the constellation of Perseus. The system is fairly close, and is located about 254 light-years (78 parsecs) away, based on its parallax.

Tau Persei is an eclipsing binary, which means the two stellar components orbit each other in such an orientation that they periodically eclipse each other, while blocking the other's light. Unlike many eclipsing binaries that have short orbital periods, Tau Persei has an orbital period of 4.15 years. With a semi-major axis of 0.055 arcseconds, this is one of the few eclipsing binaries whose components can be resolved with interferometry.

The primary component of Tau Persei is a red giant with a spectral type of G8III. It has a radius 16 times that of the Sun, and is about 390 million years old. Its companion is an A-type main-sequence star. In 1989, the primary star eclipsed the secondary, allowing for the stellar parameters to be derived via its light curve.

Naming

References

Persei, Tau
Perseus (constellation)
G-type giants
Persei, 18
Spectroscopic binaries
013531
017878
Durchmusterung objects
0854
A-type main-sequence stars
Algol variables